Chalermpol Noohlong (born 3 June 1975) is a Thai sprinter. He competed in the men's 4 × 400 metres relay at the 2000 Summer Olympics.

References

1975 births
Living people
Athletes (track and field) at the 2000 Summer Olympics
Chalermpol Noohlong
Chalermpol Noohlong
Southeast Asian Games medalists in athletics
Place of birth missing (living people)
Chalermpol Noohlong
Athletes (track and field) at the 1998 Asian Games
Competitors at the 2001 Southeast Asian Games
Chalermpol Noohlong
Chalermpol Noohlong
Chalermpol Noohlong